Bridget Kumwenda (born 8 September 1991), also referred to as Bridget Chalera or Bridget Kumwenda Chalera, is a Malawi netball international player. She represented Malawi at the 2011, 2015 and 2019 Netball World Cups and at the 2018 Commonwealth Games. Kumwenda was also a member of the Malawi team that finished third at the 2016 Fast5 Netball World Series.

Early life and family 
Kumwenda was born in Mzimba district, Malawi. She is a Tumbuka by tribe.

Playing career

Escom Sisters
At club level Kumwenda played for Escom Sisters. She continued to play for the team when they were renamed Kukoma Diamonds.

Malawi
Kumwenda represented Malawi at the 2011, 2015 and 2019 Netball World Cups  and at the 2018 Commonwealth Games. Kumwenda was also a member of the Malawi team that finished third at the 2016 Fast5 Netball World Series.

Notes
  Some sources suggest that Mwai Kumwenda (b. 1989) and Bridget (b. 1991) are sisters. However in interviews Mwai Kumwenda has stated she is the youngest sibling in her family. None of the interviews mention Bridget being a sister.

References

1991 births
Living people
Malawian netball players
Netball players at the 2018 Commonwealth Games
Commonwealth Games competitors for Malawi
2019 Netball World Cup players